Kfar Remen  is a city in the Nabatieh Governorate region of southern Lebanon;  located north east of Nabatieh.

History

Ottoman era
In  the 1596 tax records, it was named as a village,  Kfar Rumana, in the Ottoman nahiya (subdistrict) of  Sagif   under the Liwa Safad, with a population of  83 households and 1 bachelor, all Muslim. The villagers taxes on goats and bee hives, occasional revenues, a press for olive oil or grape syrup, in addition to a fixed sum; a total of 4,094  akçe.

In 1875, Victor Guérin found the village to have  180 Metuali inhabitants. The village had a mosque constructed with ancient materials.

Modern era
On 2 November 1991 units of the South Lebanon Army (SLA) toured the villages with loudspeakers ordering villagers including a Lebanese Army unit to leave immediately in the name of the Israeli Army (IDF). In the context of eight days of continuous shelling of the Nabatieh area  by the SLA and IDF many of the villagers fled, only returning after American intervention.

References

Bibliography

External links
 Kfar Roummane, Localiban

Populated places in Nabatieh District
Shia Muslim communities in Lebanon